Paul Crossan may refer to:

 PJ Crossan (born 1998), Scottish footballer
 Paul Crossan, real name of Irish radio personality Rick O'Shea